1,1-Difluoroethylene, also known as vinylidene fluoride, is a hydrofluoroolefin. It is a flammable gas. Global production in 1999 was approximately 33,000 metric tons.  It is primarily used in the production of fluoropolymers such as polyvinylidene fluoride.

Preparation
1,1-Difluoroethylene can be prepared by elimination reaction from a 1,1,1-trihaloethane compound, for example, loss of hydrogen chloride from 1-chloro-1,1-difluoroethane:.

or loss of hydrogen fluoride from 1,1,1-trifluoroethane:

See also
1,2-Difluoroethylene
Perfluoroisobutene

References

Organofluorides
Vinylidene compounds